Awilda M. Villarini-Garcia (born 6 February 1940) is a Puerto Rican composer and pianist  who publishes and performs under the name "Awilda Villarini."

Villarini was born in Patillas. Her first piano teacher was her mother, who was a church organist. She went on to earn a B. Mus. (1961) from Peabody Conservatory and a M. Mus. (1973) from the Juilliard School. Grants from the Institute of Puerto Rican Culture enabled Villarini to study piano in Paris and Vienna. She received a Ford Foundation scholarship for a Ph. D. from New York University in 1979. Her dissertation was entitled A Study of Selected Puerto Rican Danzas for the Piano. Villarini's teachers included Claus Adam, Jean Marie Darre, Carmelina Figureoa, Alexander Gorodnitzky, William Kroll, Eugene List, Walter Panhofer, and Dieter Weber.

Villarini received a grant from the National Endowment for the Arts in 1981. She was the 1985 winner of the Artist International Piano Award. The late New York Times music critic Harold C. Schonberg wrote: "I have heard Liszt's Transcendental Etude in f minor by hundreds of young pianists in different piano competitions. Ms. Villarini's technique and interpretation proved to be superior to all of them. She is an exciting romantic pianist."

Villarini's compositions include:

Chamber 

Three Fantastic Pieces (clarinet and piano)

Variaciones sobre el Canto del Coquí (unaccompanied flute)

Visiones (woodwind quintet)

Orchestra 

Cinquillo Dramatico

Concerto (orchestra and piano)

Legend of the Indian

Suite Portoricinses (also a piano reduction)

Piano 

Sonata No. 1

Suite Portoricinses (also orchestrated)

Ten Preludes

Three Preludes for Piano

Vocal 

"Dialogue" (text by Pat Parker)

Four Songs

Two Love Songs (texts by Julia de Burgos and Pablo Neruda)

References 

Living people
New York University alumni
People from Patillas, Puerto Rico
Puerto Rican women composers
Puerto Rican pianists
1940 births
Peabody Institute alumni
Juilliard School alumni
Ford Foundation fellowships
National Endowment for the Arts Fellows